Key Publications was an American comic-book company founded by Stanley P. Morse that published under the imprints Aragon Magazines, Gillmor Magazines, Medal Comics, Media Publications, S. P. M. Publications, Stanmor Publications, and Timor Publications.

History 
Stanley P. Morse's Key Publications, based variously at 1775 Broadway, 280 Madison Avenue, 175 Fifth Avenue, and 261 Fifth Avenue in New York City, New York, published comic books from 1951 to 1956. The first, a horror anthology titled Mister Mystery, under the Media Publications imprint, ran 19 issues cover-dated September 1951 to October 1954, and featured much early work by the art team of Ross Andru and Mike Esposito.

Wrote historian Lawrence Watt-Evans,

During the 1950s boom in horror comics, Morse "produced several acutely vile horror comics", wrote one historian, and "some of the grossest and most vile" of the time, concurred another. Interviewed for a 2008 book on 1950s horror comics, Morse said, "You did what you had to do — what moved 'em off the racks. ... I don't know what the hell I published. I never knew. I never read the things. I never cared."

Artist Steve Ditko, the future co-creator of Spider-Man, began his professional comics career at Key in early 1953, illustrating writer Bruce Hamilton's science-fiction story "Stretching Things" for Key's Stanmor Publications, which sold the story to Ajax/Farrell, where it finally found publication in Fantastic Fears #5 (Feb. 1954). Ditko's first published work was his second professional story, the six-page "Paper Romance" in Daring Love #1 (Oct. 1953), published by Key's Gillmor Magazines.

Titles by imprint
Source:

Aragon

Battle Fire #1-4, #6 (April 1955 - May 1956; no issue #5)
Mister Mystery (see Media, below)
Mutiny #1-3 (Oct. 1954 - Feb. 1955)
Navy Task Force #1-6, #8 (Dec. 1954 - April 1956; no issue #7)
Weird Tales of the Future (see Key, below)

Gillmor
Action Adventure Comics #2-4 (June-Oct. 1955)
Climax #1-2 (July-Sept. 1955)
Daring Love #1 (Oct. 1953) / '"Radiant Love #2-6 (Dec. 1953 - Aug. 1954)Real Adventure Comics #1 (April 1955)Super Fun #1 (Jan. 1956)Weird Mysteries #1-12 (Oct. 1952 - Sept. 1954)Western Rough Riders #1-4 (Nov. 1954 - May 1955)

Key Publications / Medal ComicsFlying Aces #1-5 (July 1955 - May 1956; Medal Comics imprint, #3-5)Hector Comics #1-3 (Nov. 1953 - March 1954)Navy Patrol #1-4 (May-Nov. 1955; Medal Comics imprint, #4)Peter Cottontail #1-2 (Jan.-March 1954)Peter Cottontail Three Dimensional Comics #1 (Feb. 1954)Prize Mystery #1-3 (May-Sept. 1955)Silver Kid Western  #1-5 (Oct. 1954 - July 1955)Tender Romance #1-2 (Dec. 1953 - Feb. 1954) / Ideal Romance #3-8 (April 1954 - Feb. 1955) / Diary Confessions #9-12, #14 (May 1955 - April 1956; no issue #13; Medal Comics imprint, #14)Weird Chills #1-3 (July-Nov. 1954)Weird Tales of the Future #1-8 (March 1952 - July 1953; S. P. M. #1-2, 4 at least; Aragon #6 at least)

MediaMister Mystery #1-19 (Sept. 1951 - Oct. 1954); Aragon imprint #7-19

S. P. MJunior Hopp Comics #1-3 (Jan.-July 1952)Weird Tales of the Future (see Key, above)

StanmorBattle Attack #1-8 (Oct. 1954 - Dec. 1955)Battle Cry #1-20 (May 1952 - Sept. 1955)Battle Squadron #1-5 (April 1955 - Dec. 1955)Pete the Panic #1 (Nov. 1955)Warpath #1-3 (Nov. 1954 - April 1955)

TimorAlgie #1-3 (Dec. 1953 - April 1954)Animal Adventures #1-3 (Dec. 1953 - April 1954)Blazing Western #1-5 (Jan.-Sept. 1954)Crime Detector'' #1-5 (Jan.-July 1954)

References

1951 establishments in New York City
Publishing companies established in 1951
Comic book publishing companies of the United States
Companies based in New York City
Defunct comics and manga publishing companies
Defunct companies based in New York (state)
Horror comics